Kenneth Maurice Clarke (born August 28, 1956 in Savannah, Georgia) is a former professional American football defensive tackle who played fourteen seasons in the National Football League.  He played in Super Bowl XV for the Philadelphia Eagles.  Clarke played college football at Syracuse University.

1956 births
Living people
Players of American football from Savannah, Georgia
American football defensive tackles
Syracuse Orange football players
Philadelphia Eagles players
Seattle Seahawks players
Minnesota Vikings players